Foothills is the tenth studio album by New Zealand band The Bats. It was released on 13 November 2020, through Flying Nun Records.

Background
The album was recorded over the period of week during spring 2018 at a pop-up studio in the Southern Alps of New Zealand.

Critical reception
Foothills was met with "generally favorable" reviews from critics. At Metacritic, which assigns a weighted average rating out of 100 to reviews from mainstream publications, this release received an average score of 80 based on 4 reviews.

Writing for AllMusic, Fred Thomas wrote: "Over the course of Foothills, incredibly small production choices like these make a huge impact. Similar to the musical component, the lyrical content of Foothills is never too overt or heavy-handed. A band that's been active in relatively obscure circles for 38 years might be prone to tunes about growing older, nostalgia, or struggles with change, but if those expected themes appear, they come up more as emotional implications or nods to universal feelings instead of blunt statements." Jennifer Kelly of Dusted Magazine said: "Foothills further distills this soft-focus, rueful vision, purifies it and delivers exactly what you expect from this band, only a little prettier and more touching than the last time. At Spectrum Culture, Justin Cober-Lake noted: "The songs mediate between fanciful experiences, taking different routes but both suggesting the hopeful capabilities of active creativity. They play with a loose precision and a casual formalism that, even four decades in, continues to sound new, even if we can trace a lengthy musical history to it at this point."

Track listing

Charts

References

External links
 
 

The Bats (New Zealand band) albums 
2020 albums
Flying Nun Records albums